Presumed Innocent may refer to:

 Presumption of innocence, a legal principle
 Presumed Innocent (novel), a 1987 novel by Scott Turow
 Presumed Innocent (film), a 1990 adaptation of the novel, directed by Alan J. Pakula
 "Presumed Innocent" (The Bill), a 1996 TV episode
 "Presumed Innocent" (Judging Amy), a 1999 TV episode
 Presumed Innocent (album), by Marcia Ball, 2001